Osman Maglajlić (28 April 1921 – 4 August 2010) was a notable Bosnian and Yugoslav sports administrator. He was one of the founders of FK Sarajevo and later club president of the assembly, two-term board member of the Football Association of Yugoslavia and notable committee member and later director of USD Bosna. His cousin Vahida Maglajlić (17 April 1907 – 1 April 1943) was a Yugoslav Partisan recognized as a People's Hero of Yugoslavia for her part in the struggle against the Axis powers during World War II.

References

1921 births
2010 deaths
People from Banja Luka
FK Sarajevo presidents of the assembly
Bosniaks of Bosnia and Herzegovina
University of Sarajevo alumni
Yugoslav people